Port Maitland (population: 503) is a small community in Yarmouth County, Nova Scotia, Canada. It is near the town of Yarmouth, and very near to the community of Beaver River. Salmon River also very nearby, lies within Digby County. The community covers 81.46 km2.

History

Port Maitland, was heavily influenced by the Henry Alline's new light Baptist movement of the late 18th century. Both Port Maitland and Beaver River tend to be Baptist in confession and English in ethnic origin. The community is, however, only a short distance away from the primarily Acadian-French speaking, Catholic municipality of Clare in Digby County, as well as from such historically black communities as Hectanooga. The Calvinist Baptist Cemetery, one of three old cemeteries overseen by the Oldstones Society, is located at the North boundary of the town as one enters Beaver River. These cemeteries are the resting place of many of the community's founding families, many of whom are descendants of the earliest settlers in Canada and the USA.

Present day

Along the Evangeline trail, which is also Route 1, there are three recently restored cemeteries now maintained by the Old Stones - Old Beaver River and Port Maitland Cemeteries Preservation Society.

Neighbourhoods

Twin Lake Properties – Residential, High income properties.

Port Maitland Provincial Park

There is a provincial park on Port Maitland Beach, which is easily reached from the community. The park features a large sandy beach, several shaded picnic tables and bathroom facilities. Lifeguards are on duty. It is one of the few remaining beaches in Nova Scotia that allows you to walk your dog on a leash. There is a sign by the beach with a picture of a dog on a leash.

References

Communities in Yarmouth County
Beaches of Nova Scotia
General Service Areas in Nova Scotia